Saint Rose (usually written as St. Rose) is a census-designated place (CDP) in St. Charles Parish, Louisiana, United States. St. Rose is on the east bank of the Mississippi River, two miles (3 km) north of the Jefferson Parish border and is part of the Greater New Orleans metropolitan area. The population was 6,540 in the 2000 census, and 7,504 in 2020.

History

The LaBranche Plantation Dependency House is located in St. Rose. It is a surviving building of the LaBranche Plantation. The main house was the plantation home built by the Zweig family in 1792. The plantation was based on the cultivation and processing of sugar cane and was dependent on slave labor. The big house was destroyed during the Civil War. One of the few buildings left on the property after the Civil War was the dependency house, also called a garconnière (French for bachelor quarters). The property also has a preserved slave quarters building.

In 1873, Palmer Elkins purchased property in St. Rose. In 1880, Elkins invited freedman and their families to move onto his property to receive training. He established what became known as "Elkinsville" or "Freetown".

Geography
St. Rose is located at  (29.960421, -90.313094).

According to the United States Census Bureau, the CDP has a total area of 5.0 square miles (13.0 km), of which 4.0 square miles (10.5 km) is land and 1.0 square mile (2.6 km) (19.88%) is water.

Demographics 

As of the 2020 United States census, there were 7,504 people, 2,914 households, and 1,905 families residing in the CDP.

Education
St. Charles Parish Public School System operates public schools, including:
 St. Rose Elementary School (PK-5)
 Albert Cammon Middle School (6-8)
 Destrehan High School in Destrehan

Notable people
Burnell Dent, NFL linebacker for the Green Bay Packers and New York Giants
Snooks Eaglin, guitarist and singer
Roy Ebron, Basketball player in the ABA
Shelley Hennig, Miss Teen USA 2004 and actress
Jordan Jefferson, NFL quarterback for the Tampa Bay Buccaneers
Justin Jefferson, NFL wide receiver for the Minnesota Vikings
Curtis Johnson, Head football coach at Tulane University and NFL assistant coach
Beulah Levy Ledner, Dessert and pastry chef
Ed Reed, College Football Hall of Fame and NFL Hall of Fame safety for the Baltimore Ravens, Houston Texans and New York Jets
Darryl Richard, NFL defensive tackle for the New England Patriots
Margaret Taylor-Burroughs, Co-founder of the DuSable Museum of African American History in Chicago
Gary Tyler, who is believed to have been wrongly convicted of murder in 1974. He was released in 2016.
Josh Victorian, NFL cornerback for the Baltimore Ravens, Detroit Lions, Houston Texans, New England Patriots, New Orleans Saints, New York Giants and Pittsburgh Steelers
Darius Vinnett, NFL cornerback for the St. Louis Rams and Atlanta Falcons
Michael Young Jr., NFL wide receiver for the Indianapolis Colts

Gallery

References

Census-designated places in Louisiana
Census-designated places in St. Charles Parish, Louisiana
Census-designated places in New Orleans metropolitan area
Louisiana populated places on the Mississippi River